New Martinsville Downtown Historic District is a national historic district located at New Martinsville, Wetzel County, West Virginia. It encompasses 29 contributing buildings and one contributing site that include the civic and commercial core of New Martinsville. Most of the buildings in the district are two and three story masonry commercial structures dating to the late-19th and early-20th century in popular architectural styles, such as Italianate, Romanesque Revival, and Colonial Revival.  Notable buildings include the New Martinsville City Building (1895), The McCaskey Building (1898), Winer's Department Store (1908), McCrory's (c. 1905), The Masonic Temple (1913), Theater/Palmer's Drug Store (1911), Lincoln Theatre (1920), United States Post Office (1931), Wetzel County Sheriff's residence (1897-1901), and Wetzel County Courthouse (1902).

It was listed on the National Register of Historic Places in 1988.

References

National Register of Historic Places in Wetzel County, West Virginia
Historic districts in Wetzel County, West Virginia
Greek Revival architecture in West Virginia
Buildings and structures in Wetzel County, West Virginia
Italianate architecture in West Virginia
Romanesque Revival architecture in West Virginia
Colonial Revival architecture in West Virginia
Historic districts on the National Register of Historic Places in West Virginia